Michael Adams (March 22, 1950 – April 18, 2010) was an American actor, stunt performer and stunt coordinator.

Filmography

Notes

External links
 
 Stuntman Mike Adams dies at Newhall Memorial (The Signal, Santa Clarita Valley)

1950 births
2010 deaths
American male television actors
American stunt performers
American male film actors
20th-century American male actors